Pierreville may refer to the following places: 

 Pierreville, Manche, a commune in the Manche department, France
 Pierreville, Meurthe-et-Moselle, a commune in the Meurthe-et-Moselle department, France
 Pierreville, Quebec, a community in Quebec, Canada